The Evangelical Church of the Republic of Niger was founded in 1961. The congregations have considerable autonomy, so unity was very difficult to establish. It has 3,000 members, 31 congregations, and 59 house fellowships. A member of the World Communion of Reformed Churches.
Partner church relationship with the Reformed Church in America was also established.

References

Churches in Niger
Members of the World Communion of Reformed Churches
Reformed denominations in Africa
Christian organizations established in 1961
1961 establishments in Niger